The Hong Kong Audit Bureau of Circulations (Chinese: 香港出版銷數公證會), or HKABC in short, was established in April 1995.

It is a non-profit organization which aims at promoting the cause of circulation auditing in Hong Kong. It seeks to encourage a higher standard of circulation data management and reporting so as to protect the rights of advertisers and media buyers, and uphold the integrity and credibility of publishers.

See also
 Media in Hong Kong
 Newspapers of Hong Kong

External links
 http://www.hkabc.com.hk

Mass media in Hong Kong
Publishing organizations
Newspapers circulation audit